Regéc is a village in Borsod-Abaúj-Zemplén County in northeastern Hungary.

Geography
Regéc village is in the Zemplén Mountains. Has road connections with Mogyoróska, Háromhuta and Fony. The village situated in a valley opened to the west with the stream flowing toward Boldogkőváralja. Over the village the Castle of Regéc is located on a 693 meters high peak.

Gallery of the Castle

External links
Aerial photographs of Regéc
 Hungarian Catholic Lexicon: Regéc

References

Populated places in Borsod-Abaúj-Zemplén County